Ramaz Svanadze (born 2 March 1981) is a retired Georgian football player and coach, who is currently the head coach of the Georgian U-21 football team.

Playing career
Svanadze played for some Georgian clubs, before was forced to retire in 2005, at the age of 24, due to injury.

Managerial career
He has been the caretaker coach of the senior team after Slovak coach Vladimír Weiss resigned from the team, and appeared at the last match of the UEFA Nations League on 18 November 2020, in a match against Estonia, in a 0–0 draw, finishing in third place in League C.

References

External links
 Footballfact.ru Profile
 

1981 births
Living people
Footballers from Georgia (country)
Georgia (country) under-21 international footballers
Association football defenders
FC Dinamo Tbilisi players
Erovnuli Liga players
FC Lokomotivi Tbilisi players